Nigel Cleere (born 21 September 1955) is an English ornithologist. He is best known for his book, Nightjars : A Guide to the Nightjars, Nighthawks, and Their Relatives. He is a member of the British Trust for Ornithology. He joined BioMap in 2002, helping to catalogue birds found in North America, Europe and Colombia.

References

English ornithologists
Living people
1955 births